The Lofa-Mano National Park is a proposed national park in Liberia. It was proposed in 1979. The park was proposed to protect an area of unexploited forest in the north-west of the country, bordering Sierra Leone, an area described ecologically at the time as "certainly the most abundant in Liberia". The national park area would complement the adjoining Gola Forest area of Sierra Leone.

The forests are home to species of threatened birds, and the Pan-African duiker.

This area has a high value of biodiversity, where over 60 globally endangered species live, and it is also a critical corridor for wildlife.

References

National parks of Liberia
Protected areas established in 1979
Gbarpolu County